Fiberglass sheet laminating is the process of taking a thin fiberglass sheet and laminating it to another material in order to provide strength and support to that material.

Process characteristics
Fiberglass is composed of very fine strands of glass. It has many different purposes, one of which is used for strength. The strength of fiberglass depends on the size of the glass strands, the temperature, and the humidity.

Materials needed
Fiberglass sheet, resin, wood or metal roller, brush or other tool to spread epoxy, material to be strengthened

Process description
Start by applying the epoxy to the fiberglass sheet. Continue carefully but quickly until all areas are sufficiently covered by the epoxy. Next, start at one end of the material to be strengthened and stick the epoxy covered fiberglass to the material, being sure to smooth out any bubbles that may form between the material and fiberglass. If the epoxy hardens before you are able to stick the fiberglass to the material, recoat and apply again.  After the fiberglass sheet has been applied, use a roller to press the fiberglass firmly to the other sheet to ensure complete bonding has occurred.

Effect on work material
Certain laminating techniques use two steps of applying the epoxy to form resin impregnated fiber glass sheets.  In the first step there is a resin solvent mixture which is partially cured so it will not redissolve in a second coating of the same mixture.  The same resin mixture is subsequently given to the covered fiberglass with moderately cured resin in the second step. This second glaze which covers the first fills in the empty spaces between the fibers.  The second coating is also only partially cured. This partial curing of the second layer furthers the curing of the first epoxy layer. This process also produces a thin sticky layer. The first coating acts like a sealed insulating sheet, preventing glass fiber contact with conductive planes.  The second coating fills the planes and can form adhesive bonds to cores and conductive layers.

Safety
 Be sure to keep fiberglass and epoxy away from open flames
 Do not inhale excess fumes from epoxy or allow epoxy to come in contact with eyes or skin

References

External links
 A Guide for Fiberglass Operations

Composite materials
Glass applications